Renan Teixeira da Silva, sometimes known as just Renan (born 29 March 1985, in Caieiras), is a Brazilian footballer who plays as a defensive midfielder.

On January 31, 2008 Renan Teixeira was made an Italian citizen in Potenza Picena, Province of Macerata, in the Italian region of Marche, only three days after Paulo César Arruda Parente. The interesting fact to this, is that other footballers like Mauro Camoranesi and Cicinho were also made Italian citizen in Potenza Picena.

Honours
São Paulo
Campeonato Paulista: 2005
Copa Libertadores: 2005
FIFA Club World Cup: 2005

References

External links

1985 births
Living people
People from Caieiras
Brazilian footballers
Brazilian people of Italian descent
Association football midfielders
Brazilian expatriate footballers
Brazilian expatriate sportspeople in Saudi Arabia
Expatriate footballers in Saudi Arabia
Brazilian expatriate sportspeople in Portugal
Expatriate footballers in Portugal
Campeonato Brasileiro Série A players
Campeonato Brasileiro Série B players
Campeonato Brasileiro Série C players
Saudi Professional League players
Primeira Liga players
São Paulo FC players
Esporte Clube Juventude players
Cruzeiro Esporte Clube players
Ittihad FC players
Esporte Clube Vitória players
Clube Atlético Mineiro players
Guarani FC players
Vitória S.C. players
Club Athletico Paranaense players
Sport Club do Recife players
Clube Atlético Linense players
Esporte Clube São Bento players
Associação Portuguesa de Desportos players
Tupi Football Club players
Joinville Esporte Clube players
Central Sport Club players
Footballers from São Paulo (state)